Dohr is a German habitational surname for someone who lived by the gates of a town or city. Notable people with the surname include:

  (born 1964), German musicologist
 Stefan Dohr (born 1965), German horn player

German-language surnames
German toponymic surnames